Dead End is a 1969 Hong Kong action drama film directed by Chang Cheh and starring Ti Lung, Lee Ching, David Chiang, Chan Hung-lit, and Angela Yu Chien. Dead End marks the first film that Chang directed set in modern day, Ti's first leading role, and the first collaboration of director Chang with stars Ti and Chiang, dubbed "The Iron Triangle," because of their successful line of films together which would last several years.

Plot
Uninhibited youth Zhang Chun (Ti Lung) and his friends David (David Chiang) and Mary (Angela Yu Chien), while cruising on their car, meets rich heiress Wen Rou (Lee Ching). Chun and Rou fall in love at first sight and begin dating. One day, Chun and Rou witnesses a cop chasing an escaped prisoner while on their way home and Chun also picks up a pistol left behind by the prisoner.

Rou's older brother Qiang (Chan Hung-lit) dislikes Chun and always pressures him, but Chun and Rou do not care about Qiang's objection and continue dating. One day, Rou dresses up as a man for fun and goes to a café with Chun. However, a café waitress sees through the disguise. Chun got into a fight in the café and was arrested by the police. Qiang becomes furious after hearing this and sends his thugs to beat up Chun and also forbidding his sister to see Chun. Chun was unwilling to let go of Rou and afterwards, he travels to Rou's house with David. There, they were beaten up by Qiang and his thugs and David dies from his injuries.

At this point, Chun was no longer willing to tolerate and takes his pistol he found earlier and kills Qiang. Although Chun was able to escape from the crime scene, but he was followed by the police when he goes to meet Rou again. In the midst of a chaos, Chun dies in the polices' gunfire.

Cast

Box office
The film grossed HK$519,097 at the Hong Kong box office during its theatrical run from 12 to 18 July 1969 in Hong Kong.

References

External links

Dead End at Hong Kong Cinemagic

1969 films
1960s action drama films
Hong Kong action drama films
1960s teen drama films
Films directed by Chang Cheh
Shaw Brothers Studio films
Films set in Hong Kong
Films shot in Hong Kong
1969 drama films
1960s Mandarin-language films